Paralacydes bivittata is a moth of the family Erebidae. It was described by Max Bartel in 1903. It is found in the Democratic Republic of the Congo, Kenya and Tanzania.

References

Spilosomina
Moths described in 1903